Andrew Cogliano (born June 14, 1987) is a Canadian professional ice hockey player for the Colorado Avalanche of the National Hockey League (NHL). He formerly played for the Edmonton Oilers, Anaheim Ducks, Dallas Stars and the San Jose Sharks. On December 31, 2013, Cogliano became the 20th player in NHL history to play 500 consecutive games, and only the fifth to do so from the beginning of his NHL career. On November 4, 2017, Cogliano played in his 800th consecutive game, placing him in fourth place on the NHL's most consecutive games played list. The streak ended at 830 games on January 14, 2018, when Cogliano was suspended for two games. Cogliano won the Stanley Cup with the Avalanche in 2022.

Playing career

Amateur
Cogliano grew up in Woodbridge, Ontario, starting out playing minor ice hockey for the City of Vaughan Hockey Association and the Vaughan Rangers in the Ontario Minor Hockey Association (OMHA) before playing in the Greater Toronto Hockey League (GTHL) with the AAA Vaughan Kings. He played in the 2001 Quebec International Pee-Wee Hockey Tournament with Vaughan.

Cogliano was drafted in the third round, 54th overall, by the Toronto St. Michael's Majors in the 2003 Ontario Hockey League (OHL) Priority Selection. Many believed that Cogliano was the top OHL prospect that year. However, due to his interest in playing collegiate hockey in the National Collegiate Athletic Association (NCAA), he was drafted much later.

Cogliano spent two seasons with the St. Michael's Buzzers, a Tier 2 Junior "A" Team in Toronto. He was also the League's leading scorer, as well as the only player from the Ontario Junior Hockey League (OJHL) to be selected in the 2005 NHL Entry Draft.

Cogliano then moved to the NCAA and played two years for the University of Michigan Wolverines. In 2006–07, he finished third on the Wolverines in scoring with 50 points in 38 games and again won gold with Canada at the 2007 World Junior Ice Hockey Championships in Sweden. He signed a professional contract on May 2, 2007, with the Edmonton Oilers, the team which drafted him 25th overall in 2005.

Professional

Edmonton Oilers (2007–2011)

Leading up to the 2007–08 season, Cogliano had a strong training camp and made the Oilers' opening night roster. He played his first NHL game on October 4, 2007, against the San Jose Sharks, recording one assist. He scored his first NHL goal on October 8, 2007, against the Detroit Red Wings, beating All-Star goaltender Dominik Hašek.

On March 7, 9 and 11, 2008, Cogliano set an NHL record by scoring overtime goals in three consecutive games against the Columbus Blue Jackets, Chicago Blackhawks and St. Louis Blues, respectively. His stick and gloves were subsequently sent to the Hockey Hall of Fame.

Cogliano would play in all 82 of Edmonton's games during his rookie season, leading the team in appearances. He would score 45 points (18 goals and 27 assists), leading the Oilers with five game-winning goals while recording the team's highest shooting percentage at 18.4%.

In his second NHL season, his statistics declined slightly, along with fellow Oilers sophomore Sam Gagner. Cogliano posted 38 points (18 goals and 20 assists) while again playing in all 82 of his team's games. That season, Cogliano was invited to participate in the NHL YoungStars Game during the All-Star weekend in Montreal, playing for the Sophomores team. Cogliano also participated in and won the "Fastest Skater" competition during the SuperSkills event, clocking in at a time of 14.31 seconds.

In June 2009, Cogliano was confirmed to be a part of a planned blockbuster trade that would include Ladislav Šmíd and Dustin Penner being sent to the Ottawa Senators in exchange for the disgruntled All-Star forward Dany Heatley. However, Heatley ultimately exercised the no-trade clause in his contract and the deal did not materialize. Heatley would shortly after accept a trade to the San Jose Sharks instead, and Cogliano remained an Oiler.

The subsequent 2009–10 season was a difficult one for Cogliano, as his offensive production again declined and his team struggled. He would finish with 28 points (10 goals and 18 assists) in 82 games, and the Oilers finished last overall in the NHL. He was tried at all three forward positions during the season.

By the end of the 2010–11 season, Cogliano was the only Oiler who played in all 82 games, and was fifth in team scoring, with 35 points.

As part of the Oilers' rebuilding process, Cogliano was traded to the Anaheim Ducks on July 12, 2011, in exchange for a second-round draft pick in the 2013 NHL Entry Draft.

Anaheim Ducks (2011–2019)
In his second year with Anaheim, and his sixth season overall in the NHL, Cogliano made his debut in the Stanley Cup playoffs, where the Ducks, as the second seed in the Western Conference, were eliminated in the first round by the seventh-seeded Detroit Red Wings in seven games.

During the 2013–14 season, Cogliano played his 500th consecutive game in a home game against the San Jose Sharks on New Year's Eve. He became the 20th player in NHL history to reach that milestone, and only the fifth to do so from the beginning of his career. On January 25, playing in Dodger Stadium against the Los Angeles Kings in a NHL Stadium Series game, Cogliano scored into an empty net for the 100th goal of his NHL career. He finished the season with 21 goals, setting a new career high. It was his first season with 20 or more goals. In the playoffs, he scored his first-ever playoff goal against the Dallas Stars.

During the 2014–15 season, Cogliano was entrusted on the Ducks powerplay unit. Cogliano's efforts helped push the Chicago Blackhawks to 7 games before the Ducks were eliminated from the playoffs.  At the end of the season, he was nominated for the Bill Masterton Memorial Trophy for the second time. It was eventually awarded to Minnesota Wild's Devan Dubnyk.

The 2015–16 season was disappointing for Cogliano, who had recorded double digits in goals every year except for that season. Despite his slide in goals, he played on a line along with Ryan Kesler and Jakob Silfverberg, whose "shutdown" play helped the team reach the playoffs for the fourth consecutive year. Cogliano ended the season leading the Ducks in shorthanded goals and points and finishing second among Ducks forwards in hits. He was again nominated for the Bill Masterton Trophy at the end of the season, with the award eventually going to Jaromír Jágr of the Florida Panthers.

During the 2016–17 season, Cogliano was again paired with Kesler and Silfverberg to lead the team's "shutdown" line. On March 22, 2017, Cogliano played in his 777th consecutive hockey game, surpassing Craig Ramsay for the fourth-longest playing streak in NHL history. He again helped lead the Ducks to a playoff contention, playing in all 17 games against the Calgary Flames, Edmonton Oilers and Nashville Predators. At the end of the season, Cogliano was nominated for the Bill Masterton Memorial Trophy for the fourth time in his career. The award eventually went to Ottawa Senators goaltender Craig Anderson.

During the 2017–18 season, on January 12, 2018, the Ducks re-signed Cogliano to a three-year, $9.75 million contract extension that would keep him under contract until the end of the 2020–21 season. On January 13, 2018, Cogliano was issued an interference penalty for a hit on Kings' forward Adrian Kempe. After a hearing with NHL's Department of Player Safety, Cogliano was given a two-game suspension. With this, Cogliano's "iron man" streak of 830 consecutive games played ended, which was the longest active streak at the time.

Dallas Stars (2019–2021)
In the 2018–19 season, on January 14, 2019, Cogliano was traded by the Ducks to the Dallas Stars in exchange for Devin Shore. On February 26, 2019, while playing against the Vegas Golden Knights, Cogliano left the game with an upper body injury after being hit by Ryan Reaves. He sat out the next game on February 28 against the Los Angeles Kings.  It was his first game missed in his NHL career for a reason other than a suspension. He missed the next two games after that, and a fourth in April that season.

San Jose Sharks (2021–2022)
On July 28, 2021, having left the Stars as a free agent after three seasons, Cogliano was signed to a one-year, $1 million contract with the San Jose Sharks. He made his debut with the Sharks in the opening game of the  season, scoring the Sharks first goal of the year in a 4–3 victory over the Winnipeg Jets on October 16, 2021. In his accustomed checking-line role, Cogliano made 56 regular season appearances for the Sharks, registering 4 goals and 15 points.

Colorado Avalanche (2022–present)
On March 21, 2022, set to become an unrestricted free agent and with the Sharks out of playoff contention, Cogliano agreed to be dealt by San Jose to the contending Colorado Avalanche in exchange for a 2024 fifth-round draft selection. He made his debut for the Avalanche, appearing on the fourth-line in a 3–1 defeat to the Vancouver Canucks on March 23, 2022. He played eighteen games in the remainder of the regular season, recording one assist, before the Avalanche entered the 2022 Stanley Cup playoffs. After sweeping the Nashville Predators and defeating the St. Louis Blues in six games, the Avalanche reached the Western Conference Final. This was the fourth conference final appearance of Cogliano's career, this time against the Oilers, his former team. In the first game of the series against the Oilers, Cogliano scored the game-winning goal. In Game 4, Cogliano injured his hand blocking a shot, and had to exit in advance of the Avalanche completing their sweep of the Oilers to qualify for the 2022 Stanley Cup Finals. Cogliano was classified as day-to-day when the Finals began. He was ultimately able to return to play in the Finals, despite a broken finger, and earned praise from teammates for motivating them in advance of the Cup-clinching Game 6 against the Lightning.

Following a week of celebrations, on July 5, 2022, Cogliano signed a one-year, $1.25 million contract extension to remain with the Avalanche.

International play

In his final season with the St. Michael's Buzzers, Cogliano represented Canada at the 2004 World U-17 Hockey Challenge, where he led the team in scoring. He sent the stick he used in the tournament to the Hockey Hall of Fame.

In 2005–06, Cogliano represented Canada in the 2006 World Junior Ice Hockey Championships in Vancouver, winning a gold medal. He ended the tournament with 5 points in 6 games.

Cogliano again won gold with Canada at the 2007 World Junior Ice Hockey Championships, in Sweden.

Personal life
Cogliano grew up in Woodbridge, Ontario. He has a brother, Matthew, who is an elementary school teacher. Cogliano and his wife Allie have two daughters together.

Career statistics

Regular season and playoffs

International

Awards and honours

References

External links

1987 births
Living people
Anaheim Ducks players
Canadian expatriate ice hockey players in Austria
Canadian expatriate ice hockey players in the United States
Canadian ice hockey centres
Canadian people of Italian descent
Colorado Avalanche players
Dallas Stars players
Edmonton Oilers players
Edmonton Oilers draft picks
EC KAC players
Michigan Wolverines men's ice hockey players
National Hockey League first-round draft picks
People from Vaughan
San Jose Sharks players
Ice hockey people from Toronto
Stanley Cup champions